Borovkov is a Russian masculine surname, its feminine counterpart is Borovkova. It may refer to
Aleksandr Alekseevich Borovkov (born 1931), Russian mathematician
Maksym Borovkov (born 1977), Ukrainian football midfielder

See also
Borovkov-Florov D
Borovkov-Florov I-207

Russian-language surnames